Red Squirrel Lake is located within the municipality of Temagami, in Nipissing District, Ontario, Canada. The lake can be accessed from the Red Squirrel Road.

Fish in the lake include northern pike, trout, walleye, Aurora trout and smallmouth bass.

News 
In July 2015, a boat was discovered without occupants floating on Red Squirrel Lake. The Temagami Ontario Provincial Police recovered two bodies from the lake who were identified as residents of Harris Township, Ontario.

See also
Lakes of Temagami

Lakes of Temagami

References